The 1971–72 Macedonian Republic League was the 28th since its establishment. FK Tikveš Kavadarci won their 1st championship title.

Participating teams

Final table

External links
SportSport.ba
Football Federation of Macedonia 

Macedonian Football League seasons
Yugo
3